Zampina di Sammichele (in the Apulian dialect zambìne ) is a cold cut awarded the Italian designations of origin: Prodotto Agroalimentare Tradizionale (P.A.T.) and De.C.O..

Zampina originates from the region of Puglia, more specifically from the town of Sammichele di Bari. A festival dedicated to the cold cut has been held since 1967. Zampina has become a commonly consumed cold cut throughout Apulia, and its production has expanded to the towns southeast of Bari.

In 2020, the Promoter Committee for the recognition of the IGP mark of the Zampina di Sammichele di Bari was formed, composed of the Municipality of Sammichele di Bari, the Pro Loco Dino Bianco, the Centro Studi di Storia Cultura e Territorio, the G.A.L. Terra dei Trulli e di Barsento and all the butchers of Sammichele di Bari.

Etymology 
The name Zampina comes from the metal spit over which the cold cut is cooked.

History 
Its origin dates back to around 1600, where some shepherds used to make it using sheep meat from sheep that had not calved. Sheep guts were used to make the sausage, which were turned over and properly washed. Wet breadcrumbs, cheese, wild thyme and salt were added to the minced meat

The cold cut has also been dedicated the following poem:

Preparation 
Zampina is prepared with minced sheep meat, seasoned with tomato, pecorino cheese, basil, salt and pepper, and stuffed into lamb intestine. In some variants, tomato sauce is used to dilute the aroma of the sheep meat.

Consumption 

Zampina is usually stored in the refrigerator and should be eaten within a few days of preparation, it is usually cut into portions about 30 cm long, rolled into spirals of 2 or 3 coils, the so-called "wheels," which are barbecued through the use of long metal skewers. Zampina may also be panfried. The sausage is also eaten as a streetfood between bread slices

References

Related articles 

 Sammichele di Bari
 Murgia
 Cucina pugliese

Italian sausages
Fresh sausages
Cuisine of Apulia
Lunch meat
Products with protected designation of origin